The Atlanta economy is the 10th largest in the country and 18th in the world with an estimated 2014 GDP of over $324 billion. Atlanta is one of ten U.S. cities classified as an "alpha-world city" by a 2010 study at Loughborough University, and ranks fourth in the number of Fortune 500 companies headquartered within city boundaries, behind New York City, Houston, and Dallas. Several major national and international companies are headquartered in metro Atlanta, including seven Fortune 100 companies: The Coca-Cola Company, Home Depot, United Parcel Service, Delta Air Lines, AT&T Mobility, and Newell Rubbermaid. Other headquarters for some major companies in Atlanta and around the metro area include Arby's, Chick-fil-A, Earthlink, Equifax, First Data, Foundation Financial Group, Gentiva Health Services, Georgia-Pacific, NCR, Oxford Industries, RaceTrac Petroleum, Southern Company, Mirant, and Waffle House. Over 75% of the Fortune 1000 companies have a presence in the Atlanta area, and the region hosts offices of about 1,250 multinational corporations. As of 2006 Atlanta Metropolitan Area ranks as the 10th largest cybercity (high-tech center) in the US, with 126,700 high-tech jobs.

Dominant sectors
The top employment sectors in Metro Atlanta are (November 2011, excludes agriculture):

Finance

Atlanta has a sizable financial sector. The Federal Reserve System has a district headquarters in Atlanta; the Federal Reserve Bank of Atlanta, which oversees much of the deep South, relocated from downtown to Midtown in 2001. Wachovia announced plans in August 2006 to place its new credit-card division in Atlanta, and city, state and civic leaders harbor long-term hopes of having the city serve as the home of the secretariat of a future Free Trade Area of the Americas. Before being acquired by BB&T in 2019, SunTrust Banks, the seventh largest bank by asset holdings in the United States, had its home office on Peachtree Street in downtown.

Invesco Ltd., an independent investment management company is headquartered in Atlanta, and has branch offices in 20 countries. Its common stock is a constituent of the S&P 500 and trades on the New York stock exchange. In December 2013, Invesco reported assets under management (AUM) of $778.7 billion.

Healthcare and biomedical
Atlanta has a growing hi-tech community 
and is also home to a growing Biotechnology sector, gaining recognition through such events as the 2009 BIO International Convention. Atlanta is also the headquarters of the Nuclear Regulatory Commission Region II.

Adjacent to Emory University, the city is also home to the Centers for Disease Control and Prevention (CDC), with a staff of nearly 15,000 including: engineers, entomologists, epidemiologists, biologists, physicians, veterinarians, behavioral scientists, nurses, medical technologists, economists, health communicators, toxicologists, chemists, computer scientists, and statisticians. CDC has 10 other offices throughout the United States and Puerto Rico, and other staff in 45 countries around the world.

Manufacturing
The auto manufacturing sector in metropolitan Atlanta has suffered setbacks recently, including the closure of the General Motors Doraville Assembly plant in 2008, and the shutdown of Ford Motor Company's Atlanta Assembly plant in Hapeville in 2006. Kia, however, has opened a new assembly plant near West Point. Hyco International Inc, one of the world's largest manufacturers of hydraulic cylinders, is headquartered in Atlanta.

Media and communications

The city is a major cable television programming center. Ted Turner began the Turner Broadcasting System media empire in Atlanta, where he bought a UHF station that eventually became WTBS. Turner established the headquarters of the Cable News Network at CNN Center, adjacent today to Centennial Olympic Park. As his company grew, its other channels—the Cartoon Network, Boomerang, TNT, Turner South, Turner Classic Movies, CNN International, CNN en Español, HLN, and CNN Airport Network—centered their operations in Atlanta as well (Turner South has since been sold). Turner Broadcasting is a division of WarnerMedia. In 2008 Tyler Perry established his studios in Southwest Atlanta; and in 2010 EUE/Screen Gems opened soundstages in Lakewood Heights, south Atlanta. (See also: Film industry in Georgia) The Weather Channel, owned by a consortium of NBC Universal, Blackstone Group, and Bain Capital, has its offices in the Cumberland district northwest of downtown Atlanta.

Cox Enterprises, a privately held company controlled by James C. Kennedy, his sister Blair Parry-Okeden and their aunt Anne Cox Chambers, has substantial media holdings in and beyond Atlanta; it is headquartered in the city of Sandy Springs. Its Cox Communications division, headquartered in unincorporated DeKalb County, is the third-largest cable television service provider in the United States.

Film and television

Atlanta has gained recognition as being a center of TV and film production, it being determined by Gocompare.com to be in the top 10 of the most popular cities in the world where films and TV shows have been filmed. Atlanta is a major center of television production and is the hub of the nation's third-largest film industry. Atlanta counts the presence of Turner Studios, which produces content for the Turner Broadcasting family of stations; since 2008 the Tyler Perry Studios in Southwest Atlanta; and since 2010 the EUE/Screen Gems soundstages in Lakewood Heights, south Atlanta.  Atlanta is the setting for popular TV shows such as the Real Housewives of Atlanta and Tyler Perry's series. Due to Perry, the "Housewives", and others, Atlanta is also known as a center of black entertainment in the U.S.

Films set in Atlanta include two pictures that were awarded the Oscar for Best Picture:, Gone with the Wind (1939) and Driving Miss Daisy (1989).  Other films set in Atlanta include Little Darlings (1980), Sharky's Machine (1981), Outbreak (1995), Tyler Perry's Meet the Browns (2008), Life as We Know It (2010), Contagion (2011), and Baby Driver (2017).

Well-known television shows set in Atlanta include House of Payne and Tyler Perry's Meet the Browns from Tyler Perry Studios, The Real Housewives of Atlanta, the CBS sitcom Designing Women, and numerous HGTV original productions. Since moving to BET for the 2011 season, The Game -  the highest rated ad-supported sitcom ever on cable - has been shot in Atlanta. Williams Street Productions has produced multiple Adult Swim series as well as Freaknik: The Musical at their Midtown Atlanta studios.

Horror and zombie themes
Atlanta is the filming location for many horror-themed productions, including the TV series Goosebumps and its sequel Goosebumps 2: Haunted Halloween, Teen Wolf, The Walking Dead, Vampire Diaries, and the 2009 comedy Zombieland. In addition, the horror festival Atlanta HorrorFest is held yearly in October, and features the Buried Alive Film Fest, bands, and a zombie walk. These factors prompted Atlanta magazine to dub the city the "Zombie Capital of the World", and The New York Times to recognize Atlanta's stature in the genre.

Logistics

Delta Air Lines is the city's largest employer and the metro area's third largest. Delta operates the world's largest airline hub at Hartsfield-Jackson Atlanta International Airport and, together with the hub of competing carrier Southwest Airlines, has helped make Hartsfield-Jackson the world's busiest airport, both in terms of passenger traffic and aircraft operations. The airport, since its construction in the 1950s, has served as a key engine of Atlanta's economic growth.

Top employers in Metro Atlanta

Source: Metro Atlanta Chamber of Commerce, Top 25 Metro Atlanta Employers (2018-2019)

List of companies headquartered in Metro Atlanta

The following is a list of the most notable companies that were founded or have their corporate headquarters in Atlanta or the surrounding metro area.

 Apple
 Amazon 
 Aaron's, Inc.
 Acuity Brands
 Adecco (USA)
 AGCO Corporation (Duluth)
 AGL Resources
 AirWatch
 Alston & Bird
 American Cancer Society
 American Megatrends (unincorporated Gwinnett County)
 Apollo Vredestein (USA)
 Arby's
 Arden's Garden
 Arcapita
 Asbury Automotive Group
 AT&T Mobility in Lenox Park (Brookhaven, Georgia) 
 The Athlete's Foot
 Atlanta Bread Company
 Atlantis Plastics
 Axiall (formerly Georgia Gulf)
 Beazer Homes USA
 Boys & Girls Clubs of America
 BlueLinx Holdings
 Carter's
 Chick-fil-A (unincorporated Fulton County)
 Comcast
 Church's Chicken
 CNN
 Circa of America
 The Coca-Cola Company
 Coca-Cola Enterprises
 Colonial Pipeline (Alpharetta)
 Cox Automotive
 Cox Communications (Dunwoody)
 Cox Enterprises (Sandy Springs)
 Cox Media Group (Sandy Springs)
 Crawford & Company
 Dell SecureWorks
 Delta Air Lines
 Dunkin Donuts (Part of Inspire Brands)
 Double Up Digital
 EarthLink
 Elavon
 Equifax
 Exide
 Floor & Decor
 First Data (Sandy Springs)
 Focus Brands
 Foundation Financial Group
 Gas South
 GCP Technologies
 Gentiva Health Services
 Genuine Parts
 Georgia-Pacific
 Global Franchise Group 
 Global Payments
 Glock, Inc
 Gray Television
 Great Wraps
 GreyOrange AI (Roswell)
 Oracle 
 Hapag Lloyd
 Havertys
 Honeywell
 HD Supply
 The Home Depot (unincorporated Cobb County)
 Hooters of America, Inc
 Intercontinental Exchange (ICE)
 InterContinental Hotels Group (Americas Headquarters)
 Internap
 Invesco Ltd.
 Jamba Juice
 Kabbage
 King & Spalding
 Krystal
 Lockheed Martin Aeronautics (in Marietta)
 MaggieMoo's Ice Cream and Treatery
 MailChimp
 Microsoft
 Marble Slab Creamery
 Mellow Mushroom
 Mercedes-Benz (USA)
 Merial
 Mirant
 NAPA Auto Parts
 NCR
 Newell Rubbermaid
 New Vision Television
 Norfolk Southern
 North American Electric Reliability Corporation
 Novelis
 Oxford Industries
 Papa John's
 Piedmont Healthcare
 Popeyes
 Porsche AG (American headquarters)
 PulteGroup
 RaceTrac
 Remington Arms
 Rheem Manufacturing Company 
 Roark Capital Group
 Rollins/Orkin
 SANY America (in Peachtree City)
 Scientific-Atlanta (in Lawrenceville)
 Service Master
 Sharecare
 Simmons Bedding Company (in Norcross)
 Sony Mobile (North American headquarters)
 Southern Company
 Spanx
 Travelport
 Troutman Sanders
 Turner Broadcasting
 UPS (in Sandy Springs)
 Uncle Maddio's Pizza Joint
 Vision Airlines (in Suwanee)
 Visa
 Veritiv 
 Waffle House (unincorporated Gwinnett County)
 The Weather Channel (in Vinings)
 TK Elevator
 WestRock
 Wing Zone
 Yik Yak
 YP Holdings (in Tucker)

Housing market
According to the Case–Shiller index, home prices in Atlanta increased 19.1% between March 2012 and March 2013.

References

 

Television shows set in Atlanta
Television shows filmed in Georgia (U.S. state)